"Little Bitty" is a song recorded by American country music artist Alan Jackson. It was released in October 1996 as the lead-off single to Jackson's fifth studio album Everything I Love.  The song reached the top of the U.S. Billboard country music charts in December of that year, becoming his fourteenth Number One on that chart. It also reached number-one on the Canadian RPM Country Tracks and peaked at number 58 on the U.S. Billboard Hot 100 chart, making it a minor crossover hit.

The song was written by Tom T. Hall. Hall had been retired from songwriting for about a decade at the time "Little Bitty" and several other new Hall compositions were released.

Content
The song is an up-tempo number in which the narrator states that some of life's greatest joys are found in the simplicity and small things of life.

Critical reception
Deborah Evans Price, of Billboard magazine reviewed the song favorably saying that Jackson's "smooth, effortless performance is right on target." She went on to say that the lyrics were clever and that country fans had appreciated the writer Hall's style of lyrics for a long time.

Music video
The music video was directed by Roger Pistole and it was released on October 18, 1996, on CMT.

Chart positions
"Little Bitty" debuted at number 41 on the U.S. Billboard Hot Country Singles & Tracks for the week of October 26, 1996.

Year-end charts

Parodies
American country music parody artist Cledus T. Judd released a parody of "Little Bitty" titled "Mindy McCready" on his 1998 album "Did I Shave My Back For This?".

References

1996 singles
1996 songs
Alan Jackson songs
Songs written by Tom T. Hall
Song recordings produced by Keith Stegall
Arista Nashville singles